H. S. Phani Ramachandra is a Kannada film and television director. He is known for directing such classic Kannada comedy films as Ganeshana Maduve and Gauri Ganesha and the TV serial Danda Pindagalu. His films mainly portray middle class Karnataka society in a comic light.

He is particularly popular amongst a section of audience for his out of box narration movies. His very popular Kannada movies are Ganesha Subramanya, Gauri Ganesha, Ganeshana Maduve, Ganesha I Love You, Ganesha Matthe Banda.etc. Ananth Nag was a common lead actor in his movies always. He is very famous for serials: Danda Pindagalu, Daridra Lakshmiyaru, Maduve Maduve Maduve, Devru Devru Devru.

He has made 3 Kannada movies based on the novels of Telugu writer Malladi Venkata Krishna Murthy  - Ganeshana Maduve based on Vinayaka Rao Pelli, Gauri Ganesha based on Wedding Bells and Nanendu Nimmavane based on Repati Kodaku (Little Rascal). Also Ganesha I Love You was based on a story by actor Vishnuvardhan with the core plot elements adapted from  Rendu Rella Aaru by Malladi Venkata Krishna Murthy.

Television

Beedige biddavaru (discontinued)
Jagalagantiyaru(discontinued)
Sahasa Lakshmiyaru (initially titled Daridra Lakshmiyaru)
Prema pichachigalu
Dandapindagalu 
Devru Devru Devru
Trin Trin Trin
Maduve Maduve Maduve
Duddu Duddu Duduu

Filmography

Doctor Krishna (1989)
Ganeshana Maduve (1990)
Gauri Ganesha (1991)
Ganesha Subramanya (1992)
Ondu Cinema Kathe (1992)
Urvashi Kalyana (1992)
Nanendu Nimmavane (1993)
Ganeshana Galate (1995)
Annavra Makkalu (1996)
Choobaana(1997)
Ganesha I Love You (1997)
Ammavra Ganda (1997)
Ganesha Matte Banda (2008)

References

External links

Indian male screenwriters
Kannada film directors
Male actors in Kannada cinema
Indian male film actors
Living people
Kannada screenwriters
Film directors from Karnataka
20th-century Indian film directors
1956 births